Remi Vermeiren (born 23 February 1940 in Dendermonde) is a Belgian banker and businessman.

Education
He went to high school at the Royal Athenaeum of Dendermonde and graduated as licentiate in commercial and financial sciences at the Hoger instituut voor Handels- en Bestuurswetenschapen in Brussels (evening education).

Career
He started his career at the Kredietbank (KBC), and became President of the board of directors of the KBC Group at the merger of KBC, ABB and CERA in 1998. He is a leading member of the business club De Warande. He is a member of the board of Cumerio and since 2005 non-executive, independent director of DevGen.

Remi Vermeiren is one of the authors of The manifesto for the separation of Belgium (Dutch: Het Manifest voor de opsplitsing van België) which was drafted by the think tank In De Warande.

Sources
 moet België gesplitst worden? 
 Onafhankelijk Vlaanderen geen doel, maar middel 
 Vlaamse toplui vragen opsplitsing België 

1940 births
Belgian businesspeople
Living people